The Toyota bB is a mini MPV produced by the Japanese car company Toyota. The first generation launched in 2000, and the second generation was jointly developed with Daihatsu from 2005. 

The car has been badge engineered and sold as the Daihatsu Materia, Scion xB and Subaru Dex.



First generation (XP30; 2000) 

The first generation bB was based on the Toyota Vitz and the development was led by Toyota chief engineer Tetsuya Tada. While the box-shaped mini MPV was initially targeted towards Japanese men in their twenties, it is also popular with women buyers.

Production of the bB occurred between January 2000 and April 2005 at the Takaoka plant in Toyota, Aichi. Production occurred at the former Central Motors between August 2004 and December 2005 for the bB; export Scion xB model continued until December 2006. In more recent years, the first-generation bB has been at least privately imported to the United Kingdom, the Republic of Ireland, Australia and New Zealand.

Engines 
Engine choices include 1.3- and 1.5-litre inline-four engines.

Marketing 
In the United States, the first generation bB was sold under the Scion brand as the xB from June 2003 to 2007.

For the Scion xB, the front passenger area was also changed significantly with the bB's front bench seat replaced with bucket seats and the column-mounted shifter changed to a floor-mounted shifter.

Open Deck (2000–2001) 
The bB Open Deck was a coupe utility version of the bB.

Gallery

Second generation (QNC20; 2005) 

The second generation bB was unveiled at the 2005 Tokyo Motor Show. Production version went on sale in Netz dealers. The second generation Scion xB is not based on the bB, but was specifically designed by Toyota to appeal to American buyers, which was sold in Japan as Toyota Corolla Rumion. Badge engineered Daihatsu and Subaru models were also produced, but production ceased in 2012, leaving just the Toyota model. Production of the Toyota model was also ceased in May 2016, with sales ended in Japan in July 2016, and it was replaced by the Toyota Tank and its twin counterpart the Toyota Roomy, which is a rebadged Daihatsu Thor.

Design 
The vehicle was designed as "A Car-shaped Music Player" to hopefully satisfy the preferences of the younger generation. The Daihatsu version can be identified by a wider and shallower grille and indicator layout.

Body styles

Engines

Transmissions 
All models include Super ECT 4-speed automatic transmission.

Daihatsu Coo/Materia 

The Daihatsu Materia (Daihatsu Coo in Japan) replaced the Daihatsu YRV and is largely identical to the second generation of the Toyota bB. This generation has been discontinued. It came in 1.3-litre and 1.5-litre varieties with a 4WD option that was available in Japan and several European markets. There were manual and automatic gearbox options.  times are 10.8 seconds for the manual and 13.7 seconds for the auto.

In the tenth series of Top Gear, Jeremy Clarkson jokingly compared the Materia to the Ascari A10, saying, "Sure the Daihatsu Materia is a good car... but on balance... I'd choose the big, yellow, shouty car instead."

The Daihatsu Materia was only ever available with a 1.5-litre, 16 valve, fuel injected, petrol engine in the UK market.

A limited edition Daihatsu Materia Turbo version was available only for the South African market.

The vehicles were built in Head (Ikeda) Plant, Daihatsu Motor Co., Ltd.

Sales of the Daihatsu Coo ended in Japan in January 2013.

Subaru Dex 

The Subaru Dex is a badge engineered version for Subaru with the K3-VE 1.3-litre engine and a choice of FWD or 4WD.

Gallery

References

External links 

 Official webpage (in Japanese)

BB
Coupé utilities
Mini MPVs
Front-wheel-drive vehicles
Euro NCAP superminis
Cars introduced in 2006